Elián Herrera Dominguez (born February 1, 1985) is a Dominican former professional baseball utility player.  Herrera played for the Los Angeles Dodgers and Milwaukee Brewers of Major League Baseball (MLB), and the Yokohama DeNA BayStars of Nippon Professional Baseball. He played second base, third base, shortstop and all three outfield positions in his career.

Career

Los Angeles Dodgers
A native of the Dominican Republic, Herrera signed with the Los Angeles Dodgers as an undrafted free agent in 2006 and began play with the rookie class Gulf Coast Dodgers, where he was selected as a Gulf Coast League All-Star. In 2007, he played at three levels, with the rookie class Ogden Raptors, Class-A Great Lakes Loons and A-Advanced Inland Empire 66ers of San Bernardino.  Overall, he appeared in 70 games and hit .255. He appeared in only 37 games in 2008, for the same three teams, and hit .292.

In 2010, Herrera played in 97 games for the AA Chattanooga Lookouts, hitting .258 and also stole 31 bases. He also played in 25 games in AAA for the Albuquerque Isotopes, where he hit .229. For the 2011 season he played exclusively for Chattanooga, appearing in 116 games, hitting .278 and stealing 33 bases.

Herrera began the 2012 season with Albuquerque and had his contract purchased by the Dodgers when he was called up to the Majors for the first time on May 14, 2012. He made his Major League debut as a pinch hitter on May 15 against the Arizona Diamondbacks and popped out. He recorded his first hit, an RBI double, in the first inning of his first start, on May 16 against the San Diego Padres. He hit his first Major League home run on July 5, 2012 off of Wade Miley of the Diamondbacks. He appeared in 67 games with the Dodgers in 2012, batting .251

In 2013, Herrera had a couple of brief Major League call-ups but only appeared in 4 games, where he had 2 hits in 8 at-bats. He was also in 108 games at Albuquerque, where he hit .282.

Milwaukee Brewers

On November 4, 2013, he was claimed off waivers by the Milwaukee Brewers.

On July 13, 2014, Herrera had a career high five hits in one game against the Cardinals. He was the sixth player to do that hitting out of the eighth spot in the last twenty years.

On June 2, 2015, Herrera was designated for assignment.

On July 30, 2015, he re-joined the Brewers following the Carlos Gómez and Mike Fiers trade to the Houston Astros. The Brewers did not tender him a contract for the 2016 season, making him a free agent.

Los Angeles Dodgers
On December 26, 2015, Herrera returned to the Los Angeles Dodgers on a minor league contract. He was given a non-roster invitation to Dodgers spring training and he was assigned to the Triple-A Oklahoma City Dodgers to begin the season. He was released on May 14.

Yokohama DeNA BayStars
On June 1, 2016, Herrera signed with the Yokohama DeNA BayStars of Nippon Professional Baseball. He became a free agent after the 2017 season.

Diablos Rojos del México
On July 6, 2018, Herrera signed with the Diablos Rojos del México of the Mexican League. He was released on July 18, 2018.

Coaching career
On January 16, 2019, Herrera was announced as the bench coach for the Rancho Cucamonga Quakes in the Dodgers farm system. For 2020, he was assigned to the same role for the Great Lakes Loons.

References

External links

 NPB.com

1985 births
Living people
Águilas Cibaeñas players
Albuquerque Isotopes players
Chattanooga Lookouts players
Colorado Springs Sky Sox players
Diablos Rojos del México players
Dominican Republic expatriate baseball players in Mexico
Dominican Republic expatriate baseball players in Japan
Dominican Republic expatriate baseball players in the United States
Estrellas Orientales players
Great Lakes Loons players
Guerreros de Oaxaca players
Gulf Coast Dodgers players
Inland Empire 66ers of San Bernardino players
Los Angeles Dodgers players
Major League Baseball second basemen
Major League Baseball shortstops
Major League Baseball third basemen
Major League Baseball outfielders
Major League Baseball players from the Dominican Republic
Mexican League baseball left fielders
Minor league baseball coaches
Milwaukee Brewers players
Nashville Sounds players
Nippon Professional Baseball second basemen
Nippon Professional Baseball third basemen
Ogden Raptors players
Oklahoma City Dodgers players
Tigres del Licey players
Yaquis de Obregón players
Yokohama DeNA BayStars players